was a town located in Jōbō District, Okayama, Japan.

As of 2003, the town had an estimated population of 6,158 and a density of 86.51 persons per km2. The total area was 71.18 km2.

On March 31, 2005, Hokubō, along with the towns of Katsuyama, Kuse, Ochiai and Yubara, and the villages of Chūka, Kawakami, Mikamo and Yatsuka (all from Maniwa District), was merged to create the city of Maniwa.

Dissolved municipalities of Okayama Prefecture
Maniwa